Lehning is a surname. Notable people with the surname include:

Arthur Lehning (1899–2000), Dutch author, historian and anarchist
Kyle Lehning, American record producer
Michael Lehning (born 1967), German-Swiss geologist and atmospheric scientist
Jason Lehning (born 1972) U.S.-American record producer and musician 
Shalee Lehning (born 1986), American basketballer
Stéphane Lehning (born 1971) French footballer having played in the following clubs (US Vandœuvre Football - AS Nancy Lorraine - ESH - SAS Epinal)

See also 
Lehninger

German-language surnames